The Fourth Horseman may refer to:

 The Four Horsemen of the Apocalypse, the concept in the Christian Bible

Television 
 "The Fourth Horseman", episode of Survivors
 "The Fourth Horseman" (Millennium), 1998
 "The Fourth Horseman" (Stargate SG-1), two-part episode (2005–06 )

Literature 
 The Fourth Horseman, novel by Geoffrey Bocca (1980)
 The Fourth Horseman, novel by Alan E. Nourse (1983)
 The Fourth Horseman, children's novel by Kate Thompson (2006)
 "The Fourth Horseman", short story by Yoon Ha Lee (2009) 
 The Fourth Horseman (comics), comic book published by Fangoria Comics

Other uses 
 The Fourth Horseman (film), a 1932 American Western film
 "The Fourth Horseman", web episode of Afterworld

See also

 Fourth Horseman of Miami Beach, novel by Albert Halper (1960)
The Third Horseman (TV episode), 2002 season 1 episode 11 of Law&Order:Criminal Intent
 Four Horsemen of the Apocalypse (disambiguation)
 The Fifth Horseman (disambiguation)
 Horseman (disambiguation)